Shri ragam is an ancient ragam in the Carnatic tradition. It is also written as Sri or Shree. This scale does not have all the seven swaras (musical notes) in the ascending scale. Shree is the asampurna melakartha equivalent of Kharaharapriya, the 22nd Melakarta rāgam. It is the last of the 5 Ghana rāgams of Carnatic music. It is a popular rāgam that is considered to be highly auspicious.

Notably, Carnatic Shree takes the lower madhyamam being the asampurna scale equivalent of Kharaharapriya. It is not related to the Hindustani raga, Shree.

Structure and Lakshana

Shree is an asymmetric rāgam that does not contain gāndhāram or dhaivatam in the ascending scale. It is a audava-vakra-sampurna rāgam (or owdava, meaning pentatonic in ascending scale), where vakra indicates the zig-zag nature of jumping notes in descending scale. Its ārohaṇa-avarohaṇa structure (ascending and descending scale) is as follows (see swaras in Carnatic music for details on below notation and terms):

 ārohaṇa: 
 avarohaṇa:  (or) 

This scale uses the notes chatushruti rishabham, sadharana gandharam, shuddha madhyamam, panchamam, chatushruti dhaivatam and kaisiki nishadam.

Popular compositions 

Shree rāgam has been decorated with compositions by many composers. A few of the popular kritis are listed here.

Sami ninnekori, a Varnam  by Karur Devudu Iyer in Telugu
Mayanai - 5th Thiruppavai by Andal
The fifth Pancharatna Kriti Endaro mahanubhavulu composed by Tyagaraja in Telugu, the last of the 5 gems
Nama kumusumamula, Yuktamu gAdu by Tyagaraja in Telugu
Sri Varalakshmi, Sri Muladhara Chakra Vinayaka , Sri Kamalambike, Sri Abhayamba, Sri Vishvanatham Bhaje, Tyagaraja Mahadhvajaaroha and Kameshvarena Samrakshitoham by Muthuswami Dikshitar in Sanskrit
Karuna judu ninnu by Shyama Shastri in Telugu
Vanajasana Vinuta composed by Subbaraya Shastri in Telugu
Bhavayami Nanda and Reena Madadritha by Swathi Thirunal
Vande Vasudevam (Sanskrit), Dinamu Dwadasi Nedu (Telugu), O! Pavanatmaja O! Ghanuda (Telugu) by Annamacharya
Bandanene Ranga (9th Navaratna Malike), Adi Varahana (very rare composition on Lord Varaha) by Purandara Dasa in Kannada
Mangalam Arul by Papanasam Sivan in Tamil
Karuna Cheyvan Enthu by Irayimman Thampi in Malayalam

Film Songs

Language:Tamil

Tamil Devotional Songs

Related rāgams 
This section covers the theoretical and scientific aspect of this rāgam.

Scale similarities 
Madhyamavati is a rāgam which has a symmetric ascending and descending scale, which matches the ascending scale of Shree. Its ārohaṇa-avarohaṇa structure is S R2 M1 P N2 S : S N2 P M1 R2 S
Manirangu is a rāgam which has gāndhāram in the descending scale, while all other notes in both the ascending and descending scale are same as Madhyamavati. Its ārohaṇa-avarohaṇa structure is S R2 M1 P N2 S : S N2 P M1 G2 R2 S

Notes

References

Janya ragas
Janya ragas (kharaharapriya)